Timothy Corsellis (27 January 1921 – 10 October 1941) was an English poet of World War II.

Early life 
Timothy John Manley Corsellis was born on 27 January 1921 in Eltham, London, the third of the four children of Helen (née Bendall) and Douglas Corsellis. His father had lost a fore-arm at Gallipoli, but went on to become a prosperous barrister and learnt to fly his own light aircraft.  Timothy went to St. Clare preparatory school in Walmer, Kent, where John Magee, the author of "High Flight" was a contemporary and Henry Bentinck became a friend. After his father's death in an air crash in 1930, Timothy was sent to Winchester College, where he contributed poems to the school magazine and fenced.

Leaving school to start work as an articled clerk in the Town Clerk's office in Wandsworth, he divided his evenings between work as a resident volunteer at the Crown and Manor Club, a Winchester College Settlement in Hoxton, East London and entertainment in Fitzrovia, where he earned money for drinks by "conjuring", a talent which earned him the right of entry into the exclusive Magic Circle.

Wartime experience 
Strongly marked by the failure of the Munich Agreement, Corsellis registered in April 1939 as a conscientious objector on religious grounds. When war broke out he became an ARP warden. After Dunkirk, he volunteered for training as a fighter pilot. His initial training in Torquay and Carlisle  did not prepare him for his assignment to Bomber Command, an assignment which in January 1941 he refused, on the grounds that his conscience would not permit him to take part in the indiscriminate bombing of civilians. His request to join Fighter Command was met with an honourable discharge from the RAF and his application to join the Fleet Air Arm was ignored, but he was accepted by the Air Transport Auxiliary, which ferried aircraft from factory to operational squadrons. From January to July 1941, at the height of the Blitz, he worked as a full-time ARP warden, and then he began his ATA training at White Waltham in August 1941. On 10 October 1941, the aircraft Corsellis was flying stalled and crashed over Annan in Dumfriesshire, Scotland. He was 20 years old.

Literary life 
At the time of his death Corsellis was just beginning to break into London literary circles, and in death he was not forgotten. Keidrych Rhys  and Patricia Ledward  wrote elegies for him, and included some of his poems in their anthologies, Poems from the Forces,' More Poems from the Forces   and Poems of This War by Younger Poets. As John Sutherland recounts, Stephen Spender, for whom Corsellis had found war work in Wandsworth, was haunted by his sudden disappearance, and his penultimate poem, dated 1941/1995 was dedicated to "Timothy Corsellis". The American anthologist Oscar Williams championed his work, and an American poet and former war pilot, Simon Perchik, has paid him tribute. In 2004 the Oxford Dictionary of National Biography took a first step in establishing a literary canon of World War 2 poets by including nine: Keith Douglas, Sidney Keyes, Alun Lewis, Gavin Ewart, Roy Fuller, John Pudney, Henry Reed, Frank Thompson and Corsellis. Ronald Blythe wrote a moving account of his life for the Oxford Dictionary of National Biography, while critics as well known as Andrew Sinclair and D.S.R. Welland   have singled out his work.

In 2012, Helen Goethals's The Unassuming Sky: The Life and Poetry of Timothy Corsellis  made available for the first time a hundred of his  poems, arranged to bring out their "unique literary and historical  interest".  Two reviews put them into context: those of Martyn Halsall in  the Church Times  – "This study assists the debate on war poetry from 1939 to 1945" – and Ralph Townsend in The Trusty Servant – "The place of Corsellis among the Second War poets of England is established in the anthologies.  Here additional poems ... which have not before gone into print present him as an example of a young man whose education led him to take an independent moral view of things ...".

In 2014, the introduction to a War Words poetry reading by Andrew Eaton stated that "The First and Second World Wars inspired gifted writers from Wilfred Owen to Timothy Corsellis to commit to paper their personal wartime narratives.  These texts, often graphic and harrowing, have gone on to become parts of the world's cultural fabric.".

Also in 2014 the Poetry Society, supported by the War Poets Association and the Imperial War Museums, launched its Timothy Corsellis Prize Competition for a poem responding to the Second World War.  This was directed at young poets all over the world aged 14–25, and was for a poem responding to the life and/or work of Keith Douglas, Sidney Keyes, Alun Lewis, John Jarmain, Henry Reed or Timothy Corsellis, with a short comment (300 words) explaining how the competitor responded to one or more of them.  The competition will be repeated annually for at least 5 years.

Excerpts from poems

Bibliography 
 Keidrych Rhys (ed.), Poems from the Forces, Routledge, 1941
 – More Poems from the Forces, Routledge, 1943
 Patricia Ledward & Colin Strang (ed.), Poems of this War by Younger Poets, Cambridge University Press, 1942
 Robert Herring (ed.), Life and Letters Today, 1942
 John Pudney & Henry Treece (ed.), Air Force Poetry, Bodley Head, 1944
 Oscar Williams (ed.),[https://books.google.com/books?id=AXPPAAAAMAAJ&q=Timothy+Corsellis War Poets, New York, John Day Company, 1945]
 Oscar Williams (ed.), A Little Treasury of Modern Poetry, New York, Scribner & Sons, 1946
 Oscar Williams (ed.), A Little Treasury of Modern Poetry, Routledge, 1947
 Stephen Spender, World Within World, Harcourt, Brace, 1951.
 Ronald Blythe (ed.), Components of the Scene: An Anthology of Stories, Poems and Essays from the Second World War, Penguin Books, 1966
 Brian Gardner (ed.), The Terrible Rain: The War Poets 1939–1945, Methuen, 1966.
 Charles Hamblett (ed.), I Burn for England: An Anthology of the Poetry of World War II, Frewin, 1966
 Andrew Sinclair (ed.), The War Decade: An Anthology of the 1940s, Hamish Hamilton, 1989
 – War like a Wasp: The Lost Decade of the 1940s, Hamish Hamilton, 1989
 Victor Selwyn (ed.), Poems of the Second World War, Dent, Everyman's Library, 1985
 – The Voice of War, Michael Joseph, 1995
 Paul Fussell, Wartime: Understanding and Behavior in the Second World War, Oxford University Press, 1989
 Gordon Mursell, English Spirituality: From 1700 to the Present Day, John Knox Press, 2001
 Martin Barraclough (ed.), Give Me the Wings: A Celebration of English Aviation Poetry, Words by Design, 2012
 Helen Goethals, The Unassuming Sky: The Life and Poetry of Timothy Corsellis'', Cambridge Scholars Publishing, 2012.

References

External links 
Book on Timothy by Helen Goethals (The Unassuming Sky: The Life and Poetry of Timothy Corsellis)
Article on Timothy by Helen Goethals, on The War Poets Association website (From Winchester to War: Timothy Corsellis (1921–1941))
Article on Timothy by Marcus Ferrar (Timothy Corsellis – a war poet’s struggle with conscience)
Article on Timothy by Justin Croft (publication of an Antiques Roadshow discovery – war poet Timothy Corsellis)
Article on Stephen Spender, mentioning Timothy, by Paul Binding in the Independent (In paths of light)
Website dedicated to a close friend of Timothy, Henry Noel Bentinck, 1919–1997
Lesson plan to support the Timothy Corsellis Prize

1921 births
1941 deaths
20th-century male writers
20th-century English poets
Air Transport Auxiliary pilots
Aviators killed in aviation accidents or incidents in Scotland
British civilians killed in World War II
People educated at Winchester College
Royal Air Force pilots of World War II
Victims of aviation accidents or incidents in 1941
World War II poets
English conscientious objectors
Civil Defence Service personnel